The National Cowboy & Western Heritage Museum is a museum in Oklahoma City, Oklahoma, United States, with more than 28,000 Western and American Indian art works and artifacts. The facility also has the world's most extensive collection of American rodeo photographs, barbed wire, saddlery, and early rodeo trophies. Museum collections focus on preserving and interpreting the heritage of the American West. The museum becomes an art gallery during the annual Prix de West Invitational Art Exhibition and Sale each June.  The Prix de West Artists sell original works of art as a fund raiser for the museum. The expansion and renovation was designed by Curtis W. Fentress, FAIA, RIBA of Fentress Architects.

History

The museum was established in 1955 as the Cowboy Hall of Fame and Museum, from an idea proposed by Chester A. Reynolds, to honor the cowboy and his era. Later that same year, the name was changed to the National Cowboy Hall of Fame and Museum. In 1960, the name was changed again to the National Cowboy Hall of Fame and Western Heritage Center. The American Alliance of Museums gave the museum full accreditation in 2000, when it took on its present name.

To maintain the memory of the founder, the museum grants the Chester A. Reynolds Memorial Award. This prize is granted to a person or institution contributing to the preservation of American West history and heritage.

Exhibits
The museum's collection includes over 2,000 works of western art, the "William S. and Ann Atherton Art of the American West Gallery". The  exhibit space contains landscapes, portraits, colorful still lifes, and sculptures by 19th- and 20th-century artists. Its over 200 works by Charles Marion Russell, Frederic Remington, Albert Bierstadt, Solon Borglum, Thurmond Restuettenhall, Robert Lougheed, Charles Schreyvogel, and other early artists lead to the museum's prize collection of contemporary Western art created over the last 30 years by award-winning Prix de West artists. The first winner was a large oil by Clark Hulings, "Grand Canyon - Kaibob Trail", about a mule team barely crossing a Grand Canyon trail in deep winter snow. The collection also includes over 700 pieces by Edward S. Curtis, and over 350 from Joe De Yong, along with the large plaster sculpture of James Earle Fraser's End of the Trail.

 
The historical galleries include the American Cowboy Gallery, a look at the life and traditions of a working cowboy and ranching history; the American Rodeo Gallery, fashioned after a 1950s rodeo arena, provides a look at America's native sport; the Joe Grandee Museum of the Frontier West Gallery exhibits some of the more than 4,500 artifacts once belonging to Western artist Joe Grandee; the Native American Gallery, focuses on the embellishments that Western tribes made to their everyday objects to reflect their beliefs and histories; the Weitzenhoffer Gallery of Fine American Firearms houses over 100 examples of firearms, by Colt, Remington, Smith & Wesson, Sharps, Winchester, Marlin, and Parker Brothers.

The museum also houses Prosperity Junction, a  authentic turn-of-the-century Western prairie town. Visitors can stroll the streets, peek in some of the store windows, listen to antique player pianos, and actually walk into some of the fully furnished buildings. The town comes alive with historical figures once a year during the museum's annual holiday open house, "A Night Before Christmas".

The museum also is home to an interactive children's museum titled Liichokoshkomo’. Making its debut to the museum in 2020, this outdoor space, meaning “let’s play”, encompasses more than 100,000 square feet and offers hands-on learning through purposeful play and engaging activities, such as dodging a geyser, grinding corn, and loading a pioneer wagon.

In September 2022, it was announced that the museum's American Rodeo Gallery would house the Professional Bull Riders Hall of Fame; opening in Spring 2023 and to be completed by 2024 or 2025.

Western Heritage Awards

Every year, during the Western Heritage Awards, the museum awards the Bronze Wrangler, an original bronze sculpture by artist John Free,  to principal creators of the winning entries in specified categories of Western literature, music, film, and television. Past winners have included Owen Wister, William S. Hart, Tom Mix, Hoot Gibson, Ken Maynard, Tim McCoy, Harry Carey, John Kent Harrison, Roy Rogers, Gene Autry, Tex Ritter, Rex Allen, John Wayne, Randolph Scott, Joel McCrea, Richard Widmark, James Stewart, Buck Taylor, Howard R. Lamar, Ben Johnson, Pernell Roberts, Arthur Allan Seidelman, Skeet Ulrich and Tom Selleck.

The Rodeo Hall of Fame recipients are not honored during the Western Heritage Awards. They celebrate at another event and inductees receive medallions instead of "The Wrangler".

In 1974, the western painter Arthur Roy Mitchell of Trinidad, Colorado received a special award, the "Honorary Trustee Award", having been cited as "the man who has done the most for southwestern history" through his collective art.

In 1975, the gelding horse Steamboat was inducted into the Cowboy Hall of Fame. Along with Clayton Danks, the rider, Steamboat is the model of the Wyoming state trademark, Bucking Horse and Rider.

Rodeo Halls of Fame

Rodeo Historical Society (RHS) awards the Hall of Fame awards, which are determined through voting by the society membership. The museum includes three halls of fame, including the Hall of Great Westerners for actual people who lived through the frontier era to present. Other halls include the Hall of Great Western Performers, for actors only, and the Rodeo Hall of Fame.

These are a few of the members of the Rodeo Hall of Fame, followed by the year they were inducted:

Donald C. and Elizabeth M. Dickinson Research Center
The Donald C. and Elizabeth M. Dickinson Research Center (originally known as the Research Library of Western Americana) opened on June 26, 1965. Today, the center serves as the library and archives of the museum. The center is a closed-stacks library, containing books, photographs, oral histories, and manuscripts focusing on western popular culture, western art, ranching, Native Americans, and rodeo.

References

External links

Museum website

 
Museums established in 1955
1955 establishments in Oklahoma
Cowboy halls of fame
Cowboy
Museums in Oklahoma City
American West museums in Oklahoma
Native Americans in Oklahoma City
Art museums and galleries in Oklahoma
Open-air museums in Oklahoma
Native American arts organizations
Culture of the Western United States
Rodeo in the United States